Birgit Jensen (born January 9, 1940) is a Danish sprint canoer who competed in the early 1960s. Finishing fifth in the K-2 500 m event at the 1960 Summer Olympics in Rome; it was her one and only ever Olympic appearance.

References
Sports-reference.com profile

1940 births
Canoeists at the 1960 Summer Olympics
Danish female canoeists
Living people
Olympic canoeists of Denmark
Place of birth missing (living people)